Joseph Ferris House is a registered historic building in Cincinnati, Ohio, listed in the National Register on June 30, 1975.  It is in the village of Fairfax, about 1 mile south of Mariemont.

Joseph Ferris and his brothers Eliphalet and Andrew came from Connecticut to the then Northwest Territory in 1799.

Historic uses
 Single dwelling

Notes

External links

 History of Mariemont written by Mariemont Preservation Foundation mentions this building's construction.

National Register of Historic Places in Cincinnati
Houses in Cincinnati
Houses on the National Register of Historic Places in Ohio